In enzymology, a ribose-5-phosphate—ammonia ligase is an enzyme that catalyzes the chemical reaction

ATP + ribose 5-phosphate + NH3  ADP + phosphate + 5-phosphoribosylamine

The 3 substrates of this enzyme are ATP, ribose 5-phosphate, and NH3, whereas its 3 products are ADP, phosphate, and 5-phosphoribosylamine.

This enzyme belongs to the family of ligases, specifically those forming generic carbon-nitrogen bonds.  The systematic name of this enzyme class is ribose-5-phosphate:ammonia ligase (ADP-forming).   This enzyme participates in purine metabolism.

References 

 

EC 6.3.4
Enzymes of unknown structure